Kasma Booty  (Jawi: كسم بوتي; born Kasmah binti Abdullah;  – 1 June 2007) is an Indonesian born-Malaysian actress and film star. She was dubbed as "Elizabeth Taylor of Malaysia".

Personal life 
She was born as Kasmah Abdullah in Kisaran, North Sumatra, Dutch East Indies (now Indonesia) of Dutch and Javanese descent. Beginning her acting and film career at the early age of 15, she ultimately changed her name to Kasma Booty after marrying her husband, Jacob Booty. The couple had four children - Cempaka, Asmara, Purnama (her youngest child) and Suria (who is now deceased).

Acting career 

She began her film career by acting in a number of films produced by Shaw Brothers. Her movies at Shaw Brothers included Cempaka (1947) and Noor Asmara (1949). Kasma next moved to the Cathay Keris Studio in Singapore before moving to the Merdeka Studio in Hulu Kelang, Malaysia in the 1960s. She received the Merak Kayangan award for veteran, long time film stars at the seventh annual Malaysian Film Festival in 1987, as well being awarded the Jury Award at the 35th annual Asia Pacific Film Festival in 1990.

Illness and death 
Kasma suffered from a number of medical conditions in her later years, including heart problems, diabetes, high blood pressure and pneumonia. She was admitted to Ampang Hospital, located in the suburb of Ampang near Kuala Lumpur on 13 May 2007, after complaining of shortness of breath due to pneumonia. While being hospitalised, she asked to visit Cameron Highlands in Pahang and Pulau Besar in Malacca. Unfortunately, her final wishes was never granted as she was unable to leave the hospital. According to an interview with her granddaughter, Jeng Riema Booty Purnama, Kasma had been well enough to eat some of her favourite foods in the hospital such as lontong, kentang putar and nasi kandar.

She died at 2 a.m on 1 June 2007 of pneumonia surrounded by her children. She was 75 at the time and left behind 12 grandchildren and two great grandchildren. Her body was buried at Kampung Klang Gate Cemetery.

Filmography 

 Shaw Brothers Studios
 Cempaka (1947)
 Pisau Beracun (1948)
 Noor Asmara (1949)
 Racun Dunia (1950)
 Bakti (1950)
 Dewi Murni (1950)
 Sejoli (1951)
 Juwita (1951)
 Manusia (1951)
 Cathay Keris Studio
 Mahsuri (1958)
 Merdeka Studio
 Keris Sempena Riau (1961)
 Selendang Merah (1962)
 Siti Payung (1962)
 Ratapan Ibu (1962)
 Tangkap Basah (1963)
 Anak Manja (1963)
 Ragam P. Ramlee (1965)
 Damak (1967)

References

External links 
 

1932 births
2007 deaths
People from Medan
Indonesian emigrants to Malaysia
Malaysian people of Javanese descent
Malaysian people of Indonesian descent
Malaysian people of Dutch descent
Malaysian Muslims
Malaysian film actresses
20th-century Malaysian actresses
Deaths from pneumonia in Malaysia
Naturalised citizens of Malaysia
Indonesian people of Dutch descent
Javanese people
Indo people
Indonesian Muslims
Members of the Order of the Defender of the Realm